Naughty may refer to:

 Naughty (Chaka Khan album), 1980
 Naughty (Adamski album), 1992
 "Naughty" (Elen Levon song), 2011
 "Naughty" (Red Velvet – Irene & Seulgi song), 2020
 Naughty (film), an American film starring Walter Hiers

See also 
 
 Noughties, a slang name for the years 2000 to 2009